Stuart Richard Young is a Trinidad and Tobago politician and attorney, representing the People's National Movement (PNM). He has served as a Member of Parliament in the House of Representatives for Port-of-Spain North/St. Ann's West since the 2015 general election. He is the current Minister of Energy and Energy Industries and Minister in the Office of the Prime Minister. Young has previously held the posts of Minister of National Security, Minister in the Ministry of the Attorney General and Legal Affairs and Minister of Communications.

Early life 

Young was the oldest of three children in Chinese Trinidadian family. He attended St Mary's College in Port of Spain, where he was head altar boy. He considered becoming a priest or accountant but ultimately decided to pursue law at the University of Nottingham in England. He was called to the Bar of England and Wales as a junior barrister at Gray's Inn in July 1997. The following year, he received a legal education certificate from the Hugh Wooding Law School and was admitted to the bar in Trinidad and Tobago. He was also admitted to the bar of the Commonwealth of Dominica and Antigua and Barbuda. 

Young has appeared as counsel in various commissions of enquiry, including the Piarco Commission of Enquiry, the Commission of Enquiry into the Construction Sector and the Commission of Enquiry into the Hindu Credit Union and CL Financial. He served on the American Chamber of Commerce legislative committee, as a board member of FUNDAID, and as a council member of the Law Association of Trinidad and Tobago. He is the chair and a founding member of Synergy Entertainment Network Limited and W.I. Sports Limited.

Political career 

Young began his political career on 18 March 2014, serving as a temporary Opposition Senator during the 4th Session of the 10th Republican Parliament. The following year, he was successfully chosen as the People's National Movement's (PNM) candidate to be the Member of Parliament in the House of Representatives for Port-of-Spain North/St Ann's West. He was elected into office on 7 September 2015. Following the election, he was appointed as a Minister in the Ministry of the Attorney General and Legal Affairs on 11 September 2015, a post that he held until 5 August 2018.

On 17 March 2016, he was assigned to the additional position of Minister in the Office of the Prime Minister. From 7 June 2018 until 20 July 2019, he was Minister of Communications and from 6 August 2018 until 18 April 2021, he was Minister of National Security. He has been described as the "Minister of Everything". Young also serves as chairman of the Finance & General Purposes Committee of the Cabinet (F&GP), as well as being a member of the National Security Council (NSC), the Energy Standing Committee, the Human Advisory Committee, the Committee of Privileges and the Statutory Instruments Committee.

Young was re-elected to office during the 2020 general election on 10 August 2020. He was appointed to the joint select committee for Energy Affairs and the Cannabis Control Bill, 2020 on 9 November 2020. He was also a co-chair of the Government Empowered Negotiating Team for energy. On 19 April 2021, he was re-assigned as Minister of Energy and Energy Industries to take over from Franklin Khan, who died in office.

In December 2022, Young was elected as the Chairman of the People's National Movement (PNM).

References 

1975 births
Living people
Members of the House of Representatives (Trinidad and Tobago)
People's National Movement politicians
21st-century Trinidad and Tobago politicians
Alumni of the University of Nottingham
Energy ministers of Trinidad and Tobago